XHDNG is a radio station that serves the state of Durango in Mexico. Broadcasting on 96.5 FM, XHDNG is owned by Grupo Garza Limón and is known as La Tremenda.

The station signed on after receiving its concession on September 13, 1990. It was the first commercial FM station in the state, with XHITD-FM 92.1 having beaten it to air as the first (though XHITD was not permitted until 1992).

References

Regional Mexican radio stations
Radio stations in Durango
Mass media in Durango City